Aethes angulatana, the angular aethes, is a species of moth of the family Tortricidae. It is found from Quebec and Maine to Florida, west to Texas and north to Minnesota.

The wingspan is 10–16 mm. The forewings are pale yellowish or cream with dark brownish-grey markings. The hindwings are drab grey with a paler fringe. Adults are on wing from June to September in the northern part of the range but earlier in the south.

References

Moths described in 1869
angulatana
Moths of North America